A.P.S. Aspida Xanthi (Athletic and Cultural Club Aspida Xanthi) is an athletic club in the city of Xanthi, Greece. It was founded in 1922. It maintains departments of football and basketball. Its name means shield and its colours are cyan and white.

The football team of the club participated in the 1939–40 Panhellenic Championship. During the next decades the team was playing mostly in the Second Division, while in the 1956–57 Greek Cup was eliminated at the quarter-finals.

In 1967, the team was merged with the other football club of the city, Orfeas Xanthi, and formed Skoda Xanthi F.C. However, after the end of the Greek military junta, the football team was formed again.

External links
history
basketball department

Xanthi
1922 establishments in Greece
Football clubs in Eastern Macedonia and Thrace
Multi-sport clubs in Greece